The Aghajari oil field is an iranian oil field located in Khuzestan Province. It was discovered by Anglo-Persian Oil Company in 1938 and developed by National Iranian Oil Company. It began production in 1940 and produces oil. The field is owned by state-owned National Iranian Oil Company (NIOC) and operated by National Iranian South Oil Company (NISOC). Aghajari Gas Injection Project is aimed at boosting production from this aging field.

References

Oil fields of Iran